Prehistoric Planet is a British-American nature documentary streaming television series about dinosaurs that premiered on Apple TV+ beginning May 23, 2022. It is produced by the BBC Studios Natural History Unit with Jon Favreau as showrunner, visual effects by MPC, and narration by natural historian David Attenborough. The documentary follows dinosaurs and other prehistoric animals recreated with computer-generated imagery living around the globe in the Late Cretaceous period, 66 million years ago (Maastrichtian), just before the dinosaurs’ extinction. It set out to depict prehistoric life using current palaeontological research by including accurately feathered dinosaurs, and probable speculative animal behaviour.

Hans Zimmer, Kara Talve and Anže Rozman composed the soundtrack. It is the first major dinosaur-focused documentary series produced by the BBC since Planet Dinosaur in 2011, and the third overall (the first was Walking with Dinosaurs in 1999). Prehistoric Planet received critical acclaim for its visual effects, depiction of dinosaurs, and Attenborough's narration.

Premise
A documentary that follows dinosaurs recreated with computer-generated imagery living around the globe in the Late Cretaceous period, 66 million years ago. It set out to depict dinosaurs using current paleontological research such as feathered dinosaurs.

Production 
According to palaeontologist and consultant Steve Brusatte, the series had been in development "a decade" prior to its trailer release. On May 8, 2019, it was first reported by Deadline that Apple had ordered a new documentary series by BBC Studios titled Prehistoric Planet, to be executively produced by Jon Favreau. An original score was composed by Kara Talve, Anže Rozman and Hans Zimmer.

The series uses up-to-date palaeontological research to depict its animals of the Cretaceous with scientific rigour; for example, feathered dinosaurs are featured in the series, such as juvenile Tyrannosaurus rex. Palaeozoologist Darren Naish was the lead consultant for the depictions of prehistoric life in the series. The concept art and creature design was created by Jellyfish Pictures, while computer-generated imagery was developed by MPC and intended to be photorealistic, as with their previous productions The Jungle Book (2016) and The Lion King (2019).

A first sneak peek was posted to the official Apple TV+ YouTube channel on April 2, 2022, along with a trailer, with a May 23 airdate set for the first episode. A ten-second teaser was released on April 19, 2022, followed by an official trailer the following day. A second trailer was released on May 19, 2022, in the lead up to the show's premiere.

After its release, the series consultants other than Darren Naish were revealed to be Steve Brusatte, Alexander Farnsworth, Kiersten Formoso, Michael Habib, Scott Hartman, John R. Hutchinson, Luke Muscutt, Peter Skelton, Robert Spicer, Paul Valdes and Mark Witton. David Krentz, the director of Dinosaur Revolution and character designer on Disney's Dinosaur, was also revealed to have been involved in the creature development and design. In March 2023, Apple renewed the series for a second season, which is scheduled to premiere on May 22, 2023.

Episodes

Reception 
The review aggregator website Rotten Tomatoes reported a 100% approval rating with an average rating of 8.4/10, based on 30 reviews. The website's critics consensus reads, "Marrying state of the art visual effects with equally immersive narration by David Attenborough, Prehistoric Planet wondrously brings viewers back to the age of dinosaurs." On Metacritic, the series has a weighted average score of 85 out of 100, based on 8 reviews, indicating "universal acclaim".

Accolades

References

External links 
 
 

2022 American television series debuts
2022 American television series endings
2022 British television series debuts
2022 British television series endings
2020s American documentary television series
2020s British documentary television series
Documentary television series about dinosaurs
David Attenborough
Documentary films about nature
Apple TV+ original programming
English-language television shows
Television series by BBC Studios
Television shows scored by Hans Zimmer